Great Marlow, sometimes simply called Marlow, was a parliamentary borough in Buckinghamshire. It elected two Members of Parliament (MPs) to the House of Commons between 1301 and 1307, and again from 1624 until 1868, and then one member from 1868 until 1885, when the borough was abolished.

History
In the 17th century a solicitor named William Hakewill, of Lincoln's Inn, rediscovered ancient writs confirming that Amersham, Great Marlow, and Wendover had all sent members to Parliament in the past, and succeeded in re-establishing their privileges (despite the opposition of James I), so that they resumed electing members from the Parliament of 1624. Hakewill himself was elected for Amersham in 1624.

Members of Parliament

MPs 1624–1640

MPs 1640–1868

MPs 1868–1885

Election results

Elections in the 1830s

 

 

Owen Williams' death caused a by-election.

Elections in the 1840s

 

On petition, Clayton was unseated on 11 April 1842 due to bribery and Hampden was declared elected in his place.

Elections in the 1850s

Elections in the 1860s

Seat reduced to one member

Elections in the 1870s

Elections in the 1880s

References 

Robert Beatson, A Chronological Register of Both Houses of Parliament (London: Longman, Hurst, Res & Orme, 1807) 
F W S Craig, British Parliamentary Election Results 1832-1885 (2nd edition, Aldershot: Parliamentary Research Services, 1989)
 J Holladay Philbin, Parliamentary Representation 1832 - England and Wales (New Haven: Yale University Press, 1965)
 

Parliamentary constituencies in Buckinghamshire (historic)
Constituencies of the Parliament of the United Kingdom disestablished in 1885
Marlow, Buckinghamshire